Diospyros maritima (commonly known as the Malaysian persimmon, broadleaf ebony and sea ebony) is a tree in the family Ebenaceae. The specific epithet maritima means "by the sea", referring to the tree's habitat.

Description
The inflorescences bear up to 10 flowers.

Distribution and habitat
Diospyros maritima is native to an area from Japan and Taiwan to Malesia and northern Australia. Its habitat is coastal forests.

References

maritima
Trees of Japan
Trees of Taiwan
Trees of Malesia
Trees of Papuasia
Flora of Western Australia
Flora of the Northern Territory
Flora of Queensland
Plants described in 1826